Streets in the Sky is the third studio album by Coventry-based indie rock band The Enemy, released on 21 May 2012 through Cooking Vinyl and eOne Music. It entered the UK Albums Chart at no. 9, and was met with universally negative reviews.

Reception

Critical reception was mostly extremely negative, with Album of the Year rating it as the worst album of 2012 as reviewed by critics. The album scored 2.9/10 at aggregator website AnyDecentMusic? (the fourth-lowest rated album of all time). However, NME gave the album a mixed review.

Track listing

Music videos
 1,2,3,4 (acoustic)
 Gimme the Sign
 Saturday
 Saturday (acoustic)
 Like a Dancer

References

External links
 REVIEW: The Enemy single "Saturday"

2012 albums
The Enemy (UK rock band) albums
Cooking Vinyl albums
E1 Music albums